"Leave Him Out of This" is a song written by Walt Aldridge and Susan Longacre, and recorded by American country music artist Steve Wariner.  It was released in September 1991 as the first single from the album I Am Ready.  The song reached number 6 on the Billboard Hot Country Singles & Tracks chart.

Chart performance

References

1991 singles
Steve Wariner songs
Songs written by Walt Aldridge
Song recordings produced by Scott Hendricks
Arista Nashville singles
Songs written by Susan Longacre
1991 songs